Jirishanca is a  mountain in the Huayhuash mountain range in west central Peru, part of the Andes. It is the tenth highest peak in Peru and the third in the Huayhuash range (after Yerupajá and Siula Grande). Jirishanca translates as "hummingbird bill peak".

Ascents 

The mountain is notoriously difficult and has seen very few successful ascents. The first ascent in July 1957 by the Austrian mountaineers   and Siegfried Jungmair over the (north)east face has been called "one of the boldest climbing feats ever performed in the Cordillera". Their route has only been repeated once. In 1964 Gary Colliver and Glen Denny of an American expedition climbed the north ridge to the slightly lower north summit, but a traverse over the "cockscomb of ice" connecting to the main summit has so far not been attempted. On July 6, 1969, an Italian team led by the 60-year-old Riccardo Cassin forged the first route through the West face. On July 31, 1971 the Americans Dean Caldwell and Jon Bowlin first climbed the southwest face in two days. Leaving their expedition below, Bowlin and Caldwell forged their own route and reached the peak on August 1, and were back at base camp by August 2.  In 1973, a Japanese team led by Masayuki Shinohara succeeded in climbing the south east face for the first time, though it took them 49 days.

Climbing 
It is one of the hardest 6000 meter mountains of the Andes. The easier route to the summit is quoted TD but more difficult routes exist, many on them on vertical ice and with overhanging section of mixed terrain such as the Cassin route (70° ice and a pitch rated UIAA IV+).

Elevation 
The altitude of 6125 isn't likely as other data from available digital elevation models show lower elevations: SRTM yields 6028 metres and TanDEM-X 5734 metres. The height of the nearest key col is 5610 meters, leading to a topographic prominence of 484 meters. Jirishanca is considered a Mountain according to the Dominance System  and its dominance is 7.94%. Its parent peak is Yerupaja and the Topographic isolation is 3.5 kilometers.

References

Mountains of Peru
Mountains of Ancash Region
Mountains of Lima Region
Mountains of Huánuco Region
Six-thousanders of the Andes